Reubenn Rennie (born 22 October 1995) is a Cook Islands international rugby league footballer who plays as a  for the Toulouse Olympique in the RFL Championship.

Background
Rennie was born in Auckland, New Zealand. He is of Cook Islands descent. His brother Vincent Rennie is a fellow Cook Islands international.

Playing career

Club career
Rennie played for the Melbourne Storm-Cronulla-Sutherland Sharks joint team in 2014.
Rennie played for the Canterbury-Bankstown Bulldogs in 2015 and 2016.
Rennie played for the Newtown club in 2017 and 2018.
Rennie played for the Mount Pritchard Mounties between 2019 and 2021.
Rennie re-joined the Newtown side ahead of the 2022 NSW Cup season.

International career
Rennie made his senior international debut for the Cook Islands June 2016 against Lebanon. In 2022 he was named in the Cook Islands squad for the 2021 Rugby League World Cup.
In the second group stage match against , Rennie was sent to the sin bin for a dangerous lifting tackle during the Cook Islands 32-16 loss.

References
10. https://www.nswrl.com.au/players/nsw-cup/newtown-jets/reubenn-rennie/

External links
Newtown Jets profile
Cook Islands profile

1995 births
Living people
Cook Islands national rugby league team players
Mount Pritchard Mounties players
New Zealand rugby league players
New Zealand sportspeople of Cook Island descent
Newtown Jets players
Rugby league players from Auckland
Rugby league centres
Toulouse Olympique players